This is a list of Kazakh football transfers in the winter transfer window 2018 by club. Only clubs of the 2018 Kazakhstan Premier League are included, with the transfer window running from 11 January until 3 April 2018.

Kazakhstan Premier League 2018

Aktobe

In:

Out:

Akzhayik

In:

Out:

Astana

In:

Out:

Atyrau

In:

Out:

Irtysh

In:

Out:

Kairat

In:

Out:

Kaisar

In:

Out:

Kyzylzhar

In:

Out:

Ordabasy

In:

Out:

Shakhter Karagandy

In:

Out:

Tobol

In:

Out:

Zhetysu

In:

Out:

References

Kazakhstan
2017–18
Transfers